Ramil Kamilevich Valeyev (born 1 August 1973) is a Russian professional football coach and a former player.

External links
 

1973 births
Living people
Soviet footballers
Russian footballers
Russian Premier League players
FC SKA Rostov-on-Don players
FC APK Morozovsk players
FC Rostov players
FC Saturn Ramenskoye players
FC Tyumen players
FC Tobol Kurgan players
Russian football managers
Association football goalkeepers
FC Volga Ulyanovsk players